Immanuel Jaylen Quickley (born June 17, 1999) is an American professional basketball player for the New York Knicks of the National Basketball Association (NBA). He played college basketball for the Kentucky Wildcats.

High school career
While attending The John Carroll School, Quickley had a breakout sophomore campaign and averaged 17.7 points, 3.9 rebounds, 2.9 assists and 1.5 steals per game. He sunk a 3-pointer at the buzzer to lead the Patriots to a 51–50 win over future NBA player Jalen Smith and Mount Saint Joseph High School in the Baltimore Catholic League championship and earned All-Metro Player of the Year recognition. Quickley averaged 23.7 points and 7.2 assists per game as a junior and was named to the First Team All-Metro. Coming into his senior year, Quickley shot 41 percent from behind the arc on the Adidas AAU circuit. Quickley was named the MVP of his high school team after scoring 19 points in a 71–58 loss to Hudson Catholic High School in the HoopHall Classic as a senior. He posted 20.8 points, 6.7 rebounds, 6.7 assists and 3.7 steals per game as a senior and led the team to the Maryland Interscholastic Athletic Association A Conference title. Quickley was named a McDonald's All-American and participated in the Powerade Jam Fest 3-point shootout.

Recruiting
When considering colleges, by August 23, 2017, Quickley had narrowed the selection down to three: Kansas, Kentucky, and Miami. The 22nd ranked prospect by Rivals and 25th by ESPN, Quickley committed to Kentucky on September 22.

College career
As a freshman, Quickley averaged 5.2 points, 1.8 rebounds and 1.2 assists per game. Quickley scored 16 points in a 91–49 win against Eastern Kentucky on November 8, 2019. He had 18 points in a 78–70 overtime win over rival Louisville on December 28. Quickley hit a career-high eight three-pointers en route to a career-high 30 points in a 69–60 win over Texas A&M on February 25, 2020. At the conclusion of the regular season, Quickley was named SEC Player of the Year as well as the SEC First Team. He averaged 16.1 points and 4.2 rebounds per game as a sophomore. Following the season, Quickley opted to declare for the 2020 NBA draft and hired an agent.

Professional career

New York Knicks (2020-present)

Quickley was drafted by the Oklahoma City Thunder with the 25th overall pick in the 2020 NBA draft, and was then traded to the New York Knicks as part of a package for the 23rd pick, Leandro Bolmaro, on November 20, 2020. On November 28, Quickley signed with the Knicks. In his NBA debut on December 23, Quickley scored five points and exited the game in the second quarter due to injury. He returned from injury on January 2, 2021, scoring nine points in the Knicks' 106–102 win over the Indiana Pacers. April 3, 2022, Quickley recorded his first career triple-double with 20 points, 10 rebounds, and 10 assists in a 118-88 win over the Orlando Magic.

On March 5, 2023, Quickley posted a career-high 38 points in a 131-129 double overtime win over the Boston Celtics.

National team career
Quickley played for the U.S. national under-19 team in the 2017 FIBA Under-19 Basketball World Cup, where he was coached by John Calipari.

Career statistics

NBA

Regular season

|-
| style="text-align:left;"|
| style="text-align:left;"|New York
| 64 || 3 || 19.4 || .395 || .389 || .891 || 2.1 || 2.0 || .5 || .2 || 11.4
|-
| style="text-align:left;"|
| style="text-align:left;"|New York
| 78 || 3 || 23.1 || .392 || .346 || .881 || 3.2 || 3.5 || .7 || .0 || 11.3
|- class="sortbottom"
| style="text-align:center;" colspan="2"|Career
| 142 || 6 || 21.4 || .393 || .365 || .885 || 2.7 || 2.8 || .6 || .1 || 11.4

Playoffs

|-
| style="text-align:left;"|2021
| style="text-align:left;"|New York
| 5 || 0 || 15.4 || .303 || .364 || .714 || 1.4 || 1.0 || .6 || .0 || 5.8
|- class="sortbottom"
| style="text-align:center;" colspan="2"|Career
| 5 || 0 || 15.4 || .303 || .364 || .714 || 1.4 || 1.0 || .6 || .0 || 5.8

College

|-
| style="text-align:left;"|2018–19
| style="text-align:left;"|Kentucky
| 37 || 7 || 18.5 || .372 || .345 || .828 || 1.8 || 1.2 || .4 || .0 || 5.2
|-
| style="text-align:left;"|2019–20
| style="text-align:left;"|Kentucky
| 30 || 20 || 33.0 || .417 || .428 || .923 || 4.2 || 1.9 || .9 || .1 || 16.1
|- class="sortbottom"
| style="text-align:center;" colspan="2"|Career
| 67 || 27 || 25.0 || .403 || .397 || .895 || 2.9 || 1.5 || .6 || .1 || 10.1

References

External links
 Kentucky Wildcats bio
 USA Basketball bio

1999 births
Living people
African-American basketball players
American men's basketball players
Basketball players from Maryland
Kentucky Wildcats men's basketball players
New York Knicks players
Oklahoma City Thunder draft picks
Point guards
People from Havre de Grace, Maryland
Sportspeople from the Baltimore metropolitan area
21st-century African-American sportspeople